The 1824 United States presidential election in Pennsylvania took place between October 26 and December 2, 1824, as part of the 1824 United States presidential election. Voters chose 28 representatives, or electors to the Electoral College, who voted for President and Vice President.

During this election, the Democratic-Republican Party was the only major national party, and 4 different candidates from this party sought the Presidency. Pennsylvania voted for Andrew Jackson over John Quincy Adams, William H. Crawford, and Henry Clay. Jackson won Pennsylvania by a wide margin of 64.54%.

Results

See also
 List of United States presidential elections in Pennsylvania

References

Pennsylvania
1824
1824 Pennsylvania elections